The 2022–23 season is Birmingham City Football Club's 120th season in the English football league system and 12th consecutive season in the second-tier Championship. As with all English Football League clubs, the first team competed in the FA Cup, from which they were eliminated by Blackburn Rovers in the fourth round, and the EFL Cup, in which they lost to Norwich City in the first.

The season covers the period from 1 July 2022 to 30 June 2023.

Background and pre-season

On 2 July 2022, amid rumours of an imminent takeover of the club, head coach Lee Bowyer was sacked, to be replaced the following day by John Eustace.

The club planned a pre-season training camp in Portugal, to include a friendly match against Primeira Liga club Portimonense, and domestic friendlies away to League One clubs Burton Albion and Cheltenham Town, and at home to Rayo Vallecano. On the same date as the Cheltenham match, a Birmingham team faced Solihull Moors for the inaugural Arthur Cup, a match in aid of children's charities in memory of Arthur Labinjo-Hughes.

EFL Championship 

Birmingham opened their season with a goalless draw away to Luton Town. There were four debutants: John Ruddy in goal and three loanees, Dion Sanderson, in his second loan spell with the club, and Auston Trusty in central defence, and Przemysław Płacheta at wing-back. Thre three-man back line was completed by Marc Roberts and Maxime Colin was the other wing-back. Ryan Woods, Jordan James, and Juninho Bacuna formed the midfield, and the forwards were Scott Hogan and captain Troy Deeney. According to the Birmingham Mail assessment, Ruddy's "commanding presence" and a well-organised defence prevented the hosts taking advantage of their greater number of chances; Luton manager Nathan Jones complained about Birmingham's time-wasting tactics.

League table (part)

Results summary

Match results

FA Cup 

As with all teams in the top two divisions, Birmingham entered the competition in the third round, in which they were drawn away to League One club Forest Green Rovers.

EFL Cup 

Birmingham made seven changes from their previous starting eleven for the first-round visit to fellow Championship club Norwich City; the three-man central midfield comprised Jordan James, a first-team regular at just 18, Alfie Chang (19), and Jobe Bellingham, the 16-year-old brother of England international Jude. Norwich took a two-goal lead in first-half stoppage time, but Jonathan Leko's first goal for the club and an own goal following a corner kick brought the scores level, so the tie was determined on penalties. Sam Cosgrove and Leko missed their kicks, but Norwich missed only one of their first four, so went through to the next round.

Transfers
For those players released or contract ended before the start of this season, see 2021–22 Birmingham City F.C. season.

In

  Brackets round a club's name indicate the player's contract with that club had expired before he joined Birmingham.
 * Signed primarily for the development squad

Loaned in

Out

  Brackets round a club's name denote the player joined that club after his Birmingham City contract expired.

Loaned out

Appearances and goals
Sources:

Numbers in parentheses denote appearances as substitute.
Players with name and squad number struck through and marked  left the club during the playing season.
Players with names in italics and marked * were on loan from another club for the whole of their season with Birmingham.
Players listed with no appearances have been in the matchday squad but only as unused substitutes.
Key to positions: GK – Goalkeeper; DF – Defender; MF – Midfielder; FW – Forward

References

External links

Birmingham City F.C. seasons
Birmingham City F.C.
English football clubs 2022–23 season